The Zhou dynasty (Old Chinese (B&S): *tiw) was a royal dynasty of China (1046 BC – 256 BC) that followed the Shang dynasty. Having lasted 789 years, the Zhou dynasty was the longest dynastic regime in Chinese history. The military control of China by the royal house, surnamed Ji, lasted initially from 1046 until 771 BC for a period known as the Western Zhou, and the political sphere of influence it created continued well into the Eastern Zhou period for another 500 years. The establishment date of 1046 BC is supported by the Xia–Shang–Zhou Chronology Project and David Pankenier, but David Nivison and Edward L. Shaughnessy date the establishment to 1045 BC.

During the Zhou dynasty, centralized power decreased throughout the Spring and Autumn period until the Warring States period in the last two centuries of the dynasty. In the latter period, the Zhou court had little control over its constituent states that were at war with each other until the Qin state consolidated power and formed the Qin dynasty in 221 BC. The Zhou dynasty had formally collapsed only 35 years earlier, although the dynasty had only nominal power at that point.

This period of Chinese history produced what many consider the zenith of Chinese bronzeware making. The latter period of the Zhou dynasty is also famous for the beginnings of three major Chinese philosophies: Confucianism, Taoism and Legalism. The Zhou dynasty also spans the period in which the written script evolved from the oracle script and bronze script into the seal script, and then finally into an almost-modern form with the use of an archaic clerical script that emerged during the late Warring States period.

History

Foundation

Traditional myth
According to Chinese mythology, the Zhou lineage began when Jiang Yuan, a consort of the legendary Emperor Ku, miraculously conceived a child, Qi "the Abandoned One", after stepping into the divine footprint of Shangdi. Qi was a culture hero credited with surviving three abandonments by his mother and with greatly improving agriculture, to the point where he was granted lordship over Tai, the surname Ji, and the title Houji "Lord of Millet", by the Emperor Shun. He even received sacrifice as a harvest god. The term Hòujì was probably a hereditary title attached to a lineage.
 
Qi's son, or rather that of the Hòujì, Buzhu is said to have abandoned his position as Agrarian Master in old age and either he or his son Ju abandoned their tradition, living in the manner of the Xirong and Rongdi (see Hua–Yi distinction). Ju's son Liu, however, led his people to prosperity by restoring agriculture and settling them at a place called Bin, which his descendants ruled for generations. Tai later led the clan from Bin to Zhou, an area in the Wei River valley of modern-day Qishan County.

The duke passed over his two elder sons Taibo and Zhongyong to favor the younger Jili, a warrior in his own right. As a vassal of the Shang kings Wu Yi and Wen Ding, Jili went to conquer several Xirong tribes before being treacherously killed by Shang forces. Taibo and Zhongyong had supposedly already fled to the Yangtze delta, where they established the state of Wu among the tribes there. Jili's son Wen bribed his way out of imprisonment and moved the Zhou capital to Feng (within present-day Xi'an). Around 1046 BC, Wen's son Wu and his ally Jiang Ziya led an army of 45,000 men and 300 chariots across the Yellow River and defeated King Zhou of Shang at the Battle of Muye, marking the beginning of the Zhou dynasty. The Zhou enfeoffed a member of the defeated Shang royal family as the Duke of Song, which was held by descendants of the Shang royal family until its end. This practice was referred to as Two Kings, Three Reverences.

Culture
According to Nicholas Bodman, the Zhou appear to have spoken a language not basically different in vocabulary and syntax from that of the Shang; a recent study by David McCraw, using lexical statistics, reached the same conclusion. The Zhou emulated extensively Shang cultural practices, perhaps to legitimize their own rule, and became the successors to Shang culture. At the same time, the Zhou may also have been connected to the Xirong, a broadly defined cultural group to the west of the Shang, which the Shang regarded as tributaries. For example, Chinese philosopher Mencius (372–289 BCE) acknowledged that King Wen of Zhou had ancestry from among the Xirong, as King Wen's descendants, the Zhou kings, claimed ancestry from the legendary cultural hero Hou Ji, who might be related to the Xirong through his mother Jiang Yuan; additionally, the historical narrative and commentary work Zuo Tradition (late 4th-century BCE) mentioned that the baron of Li Rong (in today western China), after being defeated by Jin, married off his daughter Li Ji to Duke Xian of Jin. According to the historian Li Feng, the term "Rong" during the Western Zhou period was likely used to designate political and military adversaries rather than cultural and ethnic "others". Cultural artifacts of the Western Rong coexisted with Western Zhou bronze artifacts, displaying influences between them.

Western Zhou

King Wu maintained the old capital for ceremonial purposes but constructed a new one for his palace and administration nearby at Hao. Although Wu's early death left a young and inexperienced heir, the Duke of Zhou assisted his nephew King Cheng in consolidating royal power. Wary of the Duke of Zhou's increasing power, the "Three Guards", Zhou princes stationed on the eastern plain, rose in rebellion against his regency. Even though they garnered the support of independent-minded nobles, Shang partisans, and several Dongyi tribes, the Duke of Zhou quelled the rebellion, and further expanded the Zhou Kingdom into the east. To maintain Zhou authority over its greatly expanded territory and prevent other revolts, he set up the fengjian system. Furthermore, he countered Zhou's crisis of legitimacy by expounding the doctrine of the Mandate of Heaven while accommodating important Shang rituals at Wangcheng and Chengzhou.

Over time, this decentralized system became strained as the familial relationships between the Zhou kings and the regional dynasties thinned over the generations. Peripheral territories developed local power and prestige on par with that of the Zhou. When King You demoted and exiled his Jiang queen in favor of the beautiful commoner Bao Si, the disgraced queen's father the Marquis of Shen joined with Zeng and the Quanrong barbarians to sack Hao in 771 BC. With King You dead, a conclave of nobles met at Shen and declared the Marquis's grandson King Ping. The capital was moved eastward to Wangcheng, marking the end of the "Western Zhou" (p Xī Zhōu) and the beginning of the "Eastern Zhou" dynasty (p Dōng Zhōu).

Eastern Zhou

The Eastern Zhou was characterized by an accelerating collapse of royal authority, although the king's ritual importance allowed over five more centuries of rule. The Confucian chronicle of the early years of this process led to its title of the "Spring and Autumn" period. The partition of Jin in the mid-5th century BC initiated a second phase, the "Warring States". In 403 BC, the Zhou court recognized Han, Zhao, and Wei as fully independent states. Duke Hui of Wei, in 344 BC,  was the first to claim the royal title of king (Chinese: 王) for himself. Others followed, marking a turning point, as rulers did not even entertain the pretence of being vassals of the Zhou court, instead proclaiming themselves fully independent kingdoms. A series of states rose to prominence before each falling in turn, and Zhou was a minor player in most of these conflicts.

The last Zhou king is traditionally taken to be Nan, who was killed when Qin captured the capital Wangcheng in 256 BC. A "King Hui" was declared, but his splinter state was fully removed by 249 BC. Qin's unification of China concluded in 221 BC with Qin Shihuang's annexation of Qi.

The Eastern Zhou, however, is also remembered as the golden age of Chinese philosophy: the Hundred Schools of Thought which flourished as rival lords patronized itinerant shi scholars is led by the example of Qi's Jixia Academy. The Nine Schools of Thought which came to dominate the others were Confucianism (as interpreted by Mencius and others), Legalism, Taoism, Mohism, the utopian communalist Agriculturalism, two strains of Diplomatists, the sophistic Logicians, Sun-tzu's Militarists, and the Naturalists. Although only the first three of these went on to receive imperial patronage in later dynasties, doctrines from each influenced the others and Chinese society in sometimes unusual ways. The Mohists, for instance, found little interest in their praise of meritocracy but much acceptance for their mastery of defensive siege warfare; much later, however, their arguments against nepotism were used in favor of establishing the imperial examination system.

Culture and society

The Zhou heartland was the Wei River valley; this remained their primary base of power after conquering the Shang.

Mandate of Heaven and the justification of power

Zhou rulers introduced what was to prove one of East Asia's most enduring political doctrines: the concept of the "Mandate of Heaven". They did this by asserting that their moral superiority justified taking over Shang wealth and territories, and that heaven had imposed a moral mandate on them to replace the Shang and return good governance to the people.

The Mandate of Heaven was presented as a religious compact between the Zhou people and their supreme god in heaven. The Zhou agreed that since worldly affairs were supposed to align with those of the heavens, the heavens conferred legitimate power on only one person, the Zhou ruler. In return, the ruler was duty-bound to uphold heaven's principles of harmony and honor. Any ruler who failed in this duty, who let instability creep into earthly affairs, or who let his people suffer, would lose the mandate. Under this system, it was the prerogative of spiritual authority to withdraw support from any wayward ruler and to find another, more worthy one. In this way, the Zhou sky god legitimized regime change.

In using this creed, the Zhou rulers had to acknowledge that any group of rulers, even they themselves, could be ousted if they lost the mandate of heaven because of improper practices. The book of odes written during the Zhou period clearly intoned this caution.

The Zhou kings contended that heaven favored their triumph because the last Shang kings had been evil men whose policies brought pain to the people through waste and corruption. After the Zhou came to power, the mandate became a political tool.

One of the duties and privileges of the king was to create a royal calendar. This official document defined times for undertaking agricultural activities and celebrating rituals. But unexpected events such as solar eclipses or natural calamities threw the ruling house's mandate into question. Since rulers claimed that their authority came from heaven, the Zhou made great efforts to gain accurate knowledge of the stars and to perfect the astronomical system on which they based their calendar.

Zhou legitimacy also arose indirectly from Shang material culture through the use of bronze ritual vessels, statues, ornaments, and weapons. As the Zhou emulated the Shang's large scale production of ceremonial bronzes, they developed an extensive system of bronze metalworking that required a large force of tribute labor. Many of its members were Shang, who were sometimes forcibly transported to new Zhou to produce the bronze ritual objects which were then sold and distributed across the lands, symbolizing Zhou legitimacy.

Feudalism

Western writers often describe the Zhou period as "feudal" because the Zhou's fēngjiàn (封建) system invites comparison with medieval rule in Europe.

There were many similarities between the decentralized systems. When the dynasty was established, the conquered land was divided into hereditary fiefs (zhūhóu) that eventually became powerful in their own right. In matters of inheritance, the Zhou dynasty recognized only patrilineal primogeniture as legal. According to Tao (1934: 17–31), "the Tsung-fa or descent line system has the following characteristics: patrilineal descent, patrilineal succession, patriarchate, sib-exogamy, and primogeniture"

The system, also called "extensive stratified patrilineage", was defined by the anthropologist Kwang-chih Chang as "characterized by the fact that the eldest son of each generation formed the main of line descent and political authority, whereas the younger brothers were moved out to establish new lineages of lesser authority. The farther removed, the lesser the political authority". Ebrey defines the descent-line system as follows: "A great line (ta-tsung) is the line of eldest sons continuing indefinitely from a founding ancestor. A lesser line is the line of younger sons going back no more than five generations. Great lines and lesser lines continually spin off new lesser lines, founded by younger sons".

K.E. Brashier writes in his book "Ancestral Memory in Early China" about the tsung-fa system of patrilineal primogeniture: "The greater lineage, if it has survived, is the direct succession from father to eldest son and is not defined via the collateral shifts of the lesser lineages. In discussions that demarcate between trunk and collateral lines, the former is called a zong and the latter a zu, whereas the whole lineage is dubbed the shi. [...] On one hand, every son who is not the eldest and hence not heir to the lineage territory has the potential of becoming a progenitor and fostering a new trunk lineage (Ideally he would strike out to cultivate new lineage territory). [...] According to the Zou commentary, the son of heaven divided land among his feudal lords, his feudal lords divided the land among their dependent families and so forth down the pecking order to the officers who had their dependent kin and the commoners who "each had his apportioned relations and all had their graded precedence""

This type of unilineal descent-group later became the model of the Korean family through the influence of Neo-Confucianism, as Zhu Xi and others advocated its re-establishment in China.

Fēngjiàn system and bureaucracy
There were five peerage ranks below the royal ranks, in descending order with common English translations: gōng 公 "duke", hóu 侯 "marquis", bó 伯 "count", zǐ 子 "viscount", and nán 男 "baron". At times, a vigorous duke would take power from his nobles and centralize the state. Centralization became more necessary as the states began to war among themselves and decentralization encouraged more war. If a duke took power from his nobles, the state would have to be administered bureaucratically by appointed officials.

Despite these similarities, there are a number of important differences from medieval Europe. One obvious difference is that the Zhou ruled from walled cities rather than castles. Another was China's distinct class system, which lacked an organized clergy but saw Shang-descent yeomen become masters of ritual and ceremony, as well as astronomy, state affairs and ancient canons, known as ru (儒). When a dukedom was centralized, these people would find employment as government officials or officers. These hereditary classes were similar to Western knights in status and breeding, but unlike the European equivalent, they were expected to be something of a scholar instead of a warrior. Being appointed, they could move from one state to another. Some would travel from state to state peddling schemes of administrative or military reform. Those who could not find employment would often end up teaching young men who aspired to official status. The most famous of these was Confucius, who taught a system of mutual duty between superiors and inferiors. In contrast, the Legalists had no time for Confucian virtue and advocated a system of strict laws and harsh punishments. The wars of the Warring States were finally ended by the most legalist state of all, Qin. When the Qin dynasty fell and was replaced by the Han dynasty, many Chinese were relieved to return to the more humane virtues of Confucius.

Agriculture

Agriculture in the Zhou dynasty was very intensive and, in many cases, directed by the government. All farming lands were owned by nobles, who then gave their land to their serfs, a situation similar to European feudalism. For example, a piece of land was divided into nine squares in the well-field system, with the grain from the middle square taken by the government and that of surrounding squares kept by individual farmers. This way, the government was able to store surplus food and distribute it in times of famine or bad harvest. Some important manufacturing sectors during this period included bronze smelting, which was integral to making weapons and farming tools. Again, these industries were dominated by the nobility who directed the production of such materials. 

China's first projects of hydraulic engineering were initiated during the Zhou dynasty, ultimately as a means to aid agricultural irrigation. The chancellor of Wei, Sunshu Ao, who served King Zhuang of Chu, dammed a river to create an enormous irrigation reservoir in modern-day northern Anhui province. For this, Sunshu is credited as China's first hydraulic engineer. The later Wei statesman Ximen Bao, who served Marquis Wen of Wei (445–396 BC), was the first hydraulic engineer of China to have created a large irrigation canal system. As the main focus of his grandiose project, his canal work eventually diverted the waters of the entire Zhang River to a spot further up the Yellow River.

Military

The early Western Zhou supported a strong army, split into two major units: "the Six Armies of the west" and "the Eight Armies of Chengzhou". The armies campaigned in the northern Loess Plateau, modern Ningxia and the Yellow River floodplain. The military prowess of Zhou peaked during the 19th year of King Zhao's reign, when the six armies were wiped out along with King Zhao on a campaign around the Han River.  Early Zhou kings were true commanders-in-chief. They were in constant wars with barbarians on behalf of the fiefs called guo, which at that time meant "statelet" or "principality".

King Zhao was famous for repeated campaigns in the Yangtze areas and died in his last action. Later kings' campaigns were less effective. King Li led 14 armies against barbarians in the south, but failed to achieve any victory. King Xuan fought the Quanrong nomads in vain. King You was killed by the Quanrong when Haojing was sacked. Although chariots had been introduced to China during the Shang dynasty from Central Asia, the Zhou period saw the first major use of chariots in battle. Recent archaeological finds demonstrate similarities between horse burials of the Shang and Zhou dynasties and Indo-European peoples in the west. Other possible cultural influences resulting from Indo-European contact in this period may include fighting styles, head-and-hooves burials, art motifs and myths.

The Zhou army also included "Barbarian" troops such as the Di people. King Hui of Zhou married a princess of the Red Di as a sign of appreciation for the importance of the Di troops. King Xiang of Zhou also married a Di princess after receiving Di military support.

Philosophy
During the Zhou dynasty, the origins of native Chinese philosophy developed, its initial stages of development beginning in the 6th century BC. The greatest Chinese philosophers, those who made the greatest impact on later generations of Chinese, were Confucius, founder of Confucianism, and Laozi, founder of Taoism. Other philosophers, theorists, and schools of thought in this era were Mozi, founder of Mohism; Mencius, a famous Confucian who expanded upon Confucius' legacy; Shang Yang and Han Fei, responsible for the development of ancient Chinese Legalism (the core philosophy of the Qin dynasty); and Xun Zi, who was arguably the center of ancient Chinese intellectual life during his time, even more so than iconic intellectual figures such as Mencius.

The state theology of the Zhou dynasty used concepts from the Shang dynasty and mostly referred to the Shang god, Di, as Tian, a more distant and unknowable concept, yet one that anyone could utilize, the opposite view of the Shang's spirituality. The Zhou wanted to increase the number of enlightenment seekers, mystics, and those who would be interested in learning about such things as a way to further distance their people from the Shang-era paradigm and local traditions.

Li

Established during the Western period, the Li ritual system encoded an understanding of manners as an expression of the social hierarchy, ethics, and regulation concerning material life; the corresponding social practices became idealized within Confucian ideology.

The system was canonized in the Book of Rites, Zhouli, and Yili compendiums of the Han dynasty (206 BC–220 AD), thus becoming the heart of the Chinese imperial ideology. While the system was initially a respected body of concrete regulations, the fragmentation of the Western Zhou period led the ritual to drift towards moralization and formalization in regard to:

 The five orders of Chinese nobility.
 Ancestral temples (size, legitimate number of pavilions)
 Ceremonial regulations (number of ritual vessels, musical instruments, people in the dancing troupe)

Kings

The rulers of the Zhou dynasty were titled Wáng, which is normally translated into English as "king" and was also the Shang term for their rulers.
In addition to these rulers, King Wu's immediate ancestors  Danfu, Jili, and Wen  are also referred to as "Kings of Zhou", despite having been nominal vassals of the Shang kings.

NB: Dates in Chinese history before the first year of the Gonghe Regency in 841 BC are contentious and vary by source. Those below are those published by Xia–Shang–Zhou Chronology Project and Edward L. Shaughnessy's The Absolute Chronology of the Western Zhou Dynasty.

Nobles of the Ji family proclaimed Duke Hui of Eastern Zhou as King Nan's successor after their capital, Chengzhou, fell to Qin forces in 256 BC. Ji Zhao, a son of King Nan, led a resistance against Qin for five years. The dukedom fell in 249 BC. The remaining Ji family ruled Yan and Wei until 209 BC.

During Confucius's lifetime in the Spring and Autumn Period, Zhou kings had little power, and much administrative responsibility and de-facto political strength was wielded by rulers of smaller domains and local community leaders.

Astrology 

In traditional Chinese astrology, Zhou is represented by two stars, Eta Capricorni and 21 Capricorni, in "Twelve States" asterism. Zhou is also represented by the star Beta Serpentis in asterism "Right Wall", Heavenly Market enclosure (see Chinese constellations).

See also

Family tree of the Zhou dynasty
Four occupations
Historical capitals of China
Tomb of Marquis Yi of Zeng
Women in ancient and imperial China
Ritual and music system
Patriarchal system (Western Zhou)

Notes

References

Citations

Works cited

Further reading

External links

Chinese Text Project, Rulers of the Zhou period – with links to their occurrences in pre-Qin and Han texts.

 
256 BC
3rd-century BC disestablishments in China
11th-century BC establishments in China
Bronze Age in China
Dynasties in Chinese history
Former countries in Chinese history
Former monarchies of East Asia
States and territories disestablished in the 3rd century BC
States and territories established in the 11th century BC